Club Central Jounieh also known in Arabic as Al Markaziyya Jounieh is a Lebanese sports club, located in the heart of Jounieh. It has a 5000 sq-meter club and is designed as a fully equipped Lebanese clubs offering a program in many sports.

Basketball team 
The club is most known for its long-standing basketball program. Although affiliated to Collège Central Jounieh, its basketball professional program is run independently. The club has its headquarters and plays its home games in the school sports complex.
Club Central Jounieh basketball team is part of the Lebanese Basketball League second division.

References

External links
Collège Central official site

Basketball teams in Lebanon